Harry Kongshavn (23 February 1899 – 17 December 1969) was a Norwegian chess player, Norwegian Chess Championship winner (1951).

Biography
Harry Kongshavn was born in Hidra as the son of a fisherman. He worked as an electrician at Elektrisk Bureau, and built illegal radios in Oslo during the Second World War as a member of the Norwegian resistance group Wiedswang.

In the late 1940s and begin 1950s, Harry Kongshavn was one of the leading Norwegian chess players. In 1951, he won Norwegian Chess Championship.

Harry Kongshavn played for Norway in the Chess Olympiad:
 In 1950, at fourth board in the 9th Chess Olympiad in Dubrovnik (+3, =0, -7).

He died at age 70.

References

External links

Harry Kongshavn chess games at 365chess.com

1899 births
1969 deaths
People from Flekkefjord
Norwegian resistance members
Norwegian chess players
Chess Olympiad competitors
20th-century chess players